

Portugal
 Angola – Joaquim Jacques de Magalhães, Governor of Angola (1738–1748)
 Macau – Antonio de Mendonca Corte-Real, Governor of Macau (1743–1747)

Spain
 Spanish Florida – Manuel de Montiano, Governor of La Florida (1737–1749)

Kingdom of Great Britain
 Connecticut Colony – Jonathan Law, Governor of the Colony of Connecticut (1741–1750)
 Province of New York – George Clinton, Governor of the Province of New York (1743–1753)

Colonial governors
Colonial governors
1745